The 1983–84 Memphis State Tigers men's basketball team represented Memphis State University as a member of the Metro Conference during the 1983–84 NCAA Division I men's basketball season.

The Tigers won Metro Conference regular season and conference tournament titles to receive an automatic bid to the 1984 NCAA tournament. As No. 6 seed in the Midwest region, Memphis State beat Oral Roberts and upset No. 3 seed Purdue to reach the Sweet Sixteen for the third season in a row. The Houston Cougars, who would eventually participate in their third consecutive Final Four with their second straight runner-up finish, defeated Memphis State, 78–71. The Tigers finished with a 26–7 record (11–3 Metro), though the NCAA tournament results would later be vacated.

Roster

Schedule and results

|-
!colspan=9 style= | Regular season
|-

|-
!colspan=9 style= | Metro Conference tournament
|-

|-
!colspan=9 style= | NCAA Tournament
|-

Rankings

References

Memphis Tigers men's basketball seasons
1983 in sports in Tennessee
1984 in sports in Tennessee
Memphis State
Memphis State